Warhola  is a Ukrainian surname meaning "quarrel". 

Notable people with the surname include:
Andy Warhol (1928–1987), born Andrew Warhola
James Warhola (born 1955), nephew of Andy Warhol and American artist
John Warhola (1925–2010), brother of Andy Warhol and museum founder
Julia Warhola (1891–1972), mother of Andy Warhol

See also
 
 Warchoł, related surname

References

Ukrainian-language surnames